Whaddon is a village and also a civil parish within the unitary authority area of Buckinghamshire, England. It is situated just outside of Bletchley, a constituent town of Milton Keynes.

The village name is Anglo Saxon in origin, and means 'hill where wheat is grown'.  The village is referred to several times in the Anglo-Saxon Chronicle generally in the form of Hwætædun.

The village is at the centre of the ancient Whaddon Chase, the site for many centuries of royal hunting lands.  Whaddon Chase is designated an area of 'Special Landscape Interest'.

Whaddon Church of England School is a mixed Church of England primary school. It is a voluntary controlled school, which takes children from the age of four through to the age of eight. The school has approximately 50 pupils.

Richard Cox (ca.1500 – 1581), an English clergyman, who was Dean of Westminster and Bishop of Ely, was born at Whaddon.

Whaddon Hall, the village manor, was once home to the Selby family (also known as Selby-Lowndes), whose ancestor William Lowndes (1652–1724) built the larger and grander Winslow Hall. Both mansions are still private houses. During the Second World War Whaddon Hall served as headquarters of Section VIII (Communications) of MI6, as an outpost of Bletchley Park.

References

External links

Villages in Buckinghamshire
Civil parishes in Buckinghamshire